Weeksite is a naturally occurring uranium silicate mineral with the chemical formula: K2(UO2)2Si6O15•4(H2O), potassium uranyl silicate. Weeksite has a Mohs hardness of 1-2. It was named for USGS mineralogist Alice Mary Dowse Weeks (1909–1988).

Appearance
Weeksite is visually similar to other uranium minerals such as carnotite and zippeite, both being encrustations that form on other rocks (usually sandstones or limestones).

Occurrence
Weeksite was first described in 1960 for an occurrence on Topaz Mountain, Thomas Range, Juab County, Utah. 

Weeksite occurs within small "opal" veins within rhyolite and agglomerates, and as encrustations in sandstones and limestones. It occurs associated with opal, chalcedony, calcite, gypsum, fluorite, uraninite, thorogummite, uranophane, boltwoodite, carnotite and margaritasite.

See also

 Mineral evolution
 
 List of minerals named after people

References

Uranium(VI) minerals
Potassium minerals
Nesosilicates
Orthorhombic minerals
Minerals in space group 52